The County of Way is one of the 49 counties of South Australia on the state's west coast. It was proclaimed circa 1889 by Governor William Robinson and named for Samuel Way, the Chief Justice of the state's Supreme Court at the time.

Hundreds 

The County of Way contains the following 13 hundreds, covering approximately the southern half of its total area:
 Hundred of Horn, established 1889 (Charra)
 Hundred of Catt, established 1889 (Watraba, White Well Corner, Koonibba, Uworra)
 Hundred of Bartlett (Charra)
 Hundred of Moule, established 1889 (Nadia, Denial Bay)
 Hundred of O'Loughlin, established 1896 (Koonibba, Kalanbi)
 Hundred of Bonython, established 1893 (Ceduna)
 Hundred of Goode, established 1893 (Kalanbi, Wandana)
 Hundred of Wandana, established 1893 (Wandana, Merghiny, Laura Bay)
 Hundred of Blacker, established 1893 (Laura Bay, Mudamuckla, Puntabie)
 Hundred of Chillundie, established 1893 (Maltee, Merghiny, Mudamuckla)
 Hundred of Guthrie, established 1893 (Mudamuckla, Puntabie)
 Hundred of Pethick, established 1929 (Pureba
 Hundred of Wallanippie, established 1893 (Smoky Bay)

References

Way